The 1912–13 Illinois Fighting Illini men's basketball team represented the University of Illinois.

Regular season
The 1912–13 season saw yet another head coach arrive in Champaign-Urbana to work with the Illinois Fighting Illini men's basketball team.  Ralph Jones left an impressive legacy behind in West Lafayette, Indiana where he was head coach of Purdue for three years. During his tenure at Purdue, Jones compiled an impressive record of 32 wins with only 9 losses resulting in two conference championships.  Jones was credited by some with originating the fast break in basketball. After leading the Fighting Illini to two additional conference championships and one national championship, Jones left to coach at Lake Forest Academy. In addition to coaching basketball, Jones was head coach of the Chicago Bears from 1930–33, where, among other achievements, he was credited with the revival of the T-formation and the use of a man in motion to throw off the defense.

Roster

Source

Schedule
												
Source																

|-	
!colspan=12 style="background:#DF4E38; color:white;"| Non-Conference regular season
|- align="center" bgcolor=""

			

|-	
!colspan=9 style="background:#DF4E38; color:#FFFFFF;"|Big Ten regular season	

									

Bold Italic connotes conference game

References

Illinois Fighting Illini
Illinois Fighting Illini men's basketball seasons
1912 in sports in Illinois
1913 in sports in Illinois